Irasma is a 2003 Sri Lankan Sinhala children's film directed by Ariyaratne Vithana. It stars Ama Wijesekera in lead role along with Douglas Ranasinghe and Iranganie Serasinghe. Music composed by Victor Ratnayake. This is the first children's film funded by Film Development Fund of the National Film Corporation as well. The film also screened at many film festivals.

The film has received mainly positive reviews by critics. It is the 1012nd Sri Lankan film in the Sinhala cinema.

Plot

Cast
 Ama Wijesekera as Irasma Wijesundera aka Ima 
 Hirushini Abeygunawardana as little Ima
 Douglas Ranasinghe as Sonali's husband
 Iranganie Serasinghe as Ima's granny
 Maureen Charuni as Sonali, Ima's aunty
 Duleeka Marapana as Paali, Ima's mother
 Priyankara Rathnayake as Tharintha Wijesundera, Ima's father
 Romesh Sugathapala as Mahil
 Saranga Disasekara as Ima's eldest cousin

Award
 Merit Award at Prix Leonardo Film Festival, Italy

References

2003 films
2000s Sinhala-language films
Films set in Sri Lanka (1948–present)